Anchallani is a small town in Bolivia. In 2010 it had an estimated population of 813.

Location 

Anchallani is the most populous town of Luribay Municipality in Loayza Province. The village lies at an elevation of 4187m in a valley 10 km south-west of the río Luribay and 20 km from Luribay, the main town of the municipality.

Geography 

Anchallani is in the Serranía de Sicasica, between the Bolivian altiplano in the west and the Amazonian lowlands in the east.

Transport 

Anchallani is around 160 km by road south-east of La Paz.

References

Populated places in La Paz Department (Bolivia)